Jirish Mach'ay (local Quechua jirish colibri, mach'ay cave, "colibri cave", also spelled Jirishmachay) is a mountain in the Andes of Peru, about  high. It is situated in the Lima Region, Huarochiri Province, Chicla District. Jirish Mach'ay lies near the Antikuna mountain pass, south-west of the mountain Tiktimach'ay and west of the lake Tiktiqucha.

References

Mountains of Peru
Mountains of Lima Region